Welverdiend is a village in Ehlanzeni District Municipality in the Mpumalanga province of South Africa. It is situated off the road from Acornhoek to Orpen rest camp in the Kruger National Park, adjacent to the Timbavati village.

References

Populated places in the Bushbuckridge Local Municipality